Deborah Anne Batts (April 13, 1947 – February 3, 2020) was a United States district judge of the United States District Court for the Southern District of New York. During Gay Pride Week in June 1994, Batts was sworn in as a United States district judge for Manhattan, becoming the nation's first openly LGBT, African-American federal judge. She took senior status on her 65th birthday, April 13, 2012.

Biography

Batts was born in Philadelphia, Pennsylvania, to James Alexander Batts, director of the department of obstetrics and gynecology at Harlem Hospital Center, and Ruth S. Batts, nurse, homemaker, and board member of the Philadelphia Home and School Council in the 1960s.

Marriage and family 
Batts' siblings included sisters Mercedes Ellington and Denise Batts, and twin, Diane Batts Morrow.

She was married to Ira A. McCown, with whom she had two children, Alexandra S. McCown and James Ellison McCown. In 2011, Batts married Gwen Zornberg.

Education and career 
Batts received an Bachelor of Arts degree in Government from Radcliffe College in 1969, and a Juris Doctor from Harvard Law School in 1972. She subsequently clerked for Judge Lawrence Pierce of the United States district court on which she served as a judge until her death. She was an Assistant United States Attorney from 1979 to 1984. In 1984, she became the first African American faculty member and an associate professor of law at Fordham University School of Law,. She was a special associate counsel to the Department of Investigation for New York City from 1990 to 1991. Outside of work, Batts dedicated her time to the RISE program, aiming to lower recidivism amongst at-risk offenders and continued to teach at the Fordham University School of Law.

Federal judicial service

On January 27, 1994, following the recommendation of Senator Daniel Patrick Moynihan, President Bill Clinton nominated Batts to a seat on the Southern District left open in 1989 when Judge Richard Owen took senior status. Batts was confirmed by the United States Senate on May 6, 1994, and received her commission on May 9, 1994. She took senior status on April 13, 2012. She continued to serve concurrently as an adjunct professor at Fordham University.

She served until her death on February 3, 2020, from complications during knee surgery.

On October 3, 2007, Bourne Co. Music Publishers filed a lawsuit accusing Family Guy of infringing its copyright on the song "When You Wish Upon a Star", through a parody song titled "I Need a Jew" appearing in the episode "When You Wish Upon a Weinstein". Bourne Co., which holds the copyright, alleged the parody pairs a "thinly veiled" copy of their music with antisemitic lyrics. Named in the suit were Family Guy creator Seth MacFarlane, 20th Century Fox Film Corp., Fox Broadcasting Co., Cartoon Network, and Walter Murphy; the suit sought to stop the program's distribution and asked for unspecified damages. Bourne argued that "I Need a Jew" uses the copyrighted melody of "When You Wish Upon a Star" without commenting on that song, and that it was therefore not a First Amendment-protected parody per the ruling in Campbell v. Acuff-Rose Music, Inc. On March 16, 2009, Batts held that Family Guy did not infringe on Bourne's copyright when it transformed the song for comical use in an episode.

In 2007, Batts was a prominent figure in the litigation over the case of the Central Park Five, rejecting the dismissal of their lawsuit.

See also 
 List of African-American federal judges
 List of African-American jurists
 List of first women lawyers and judges in New York
 List of first women lawyers and judges in the United States
 List of LGBT jurists in the United States

References

Sources
 

1947 births
2020 deaths
African-American judges
African-American women lawyers
American women lawyers
American lawyers
African-American lawyers
Assistant United States Attorneys
Fordham University faculty
Harvard Law School alumni
Judges of the United States District Court for the Southern District of New York
LGBT African Americans
LGBT appointed officials in the United States
LGBT judges
LGBT lawyers
LGBT people from Pennsylvania
Lawyers from Philadelphia
Philadelphia High School for Girls alumni
Radcliffe College alumni
United States district court judges appointed by Bill Clinton
Cravath, Swaine & Moore people
20th-century American judges
21st-century American judges
20th-century American women judges
21st-century American women judges
21st-century African-American people
21st-century African-American women